Poppy Montgomery (born Poppy Petal Emma Elizabeth Deveraux Donahue; June 19,1972) is an Australian-born actress. She played FBI agent Samantha Spade on the CBS mystery drama Without a Trace from 2002 to 2009 and played Detective Carrie Wells on the CBS/A&E police drama Unforgettable from 2011 to 2016.

Early life
Montgomery was born in Sydney, New South Wales, Australia, to mother Nicola (née Montgomery), an executive and market researcher, and father Phil Donahue, a restaurateur. She is one of six children. Her parents named all their daughters after flowers – Poppy, Rosie, Daisy, Lily and Marigold – and their son, Jethro Tull, after the rock band Jethro Tull.

Montgomery disliked school, being expelled from six private academies before finally dropping out at the age of 15 to pursue stage acting and to travel around Bali with her then-boyfriend. Montgomery emigrated to the United States at the age of 18, arriving in Florida to meet a boyfriend whom she had met when he was an exchange student. After five days, she realized that "[she] couldn't stand him" and took a bus to Los Angeles to pursue an acting career.

Career
When Montgomery moved to Los Angeles, she stayed with two of her brother's friends while sending a head shot every day to Julia Roberts's former manager, Bob McGowan, until he signed her. She appeared in several small television roles during the late 1990s, including on NYPD Blue.

Montgomery's big break was winning the role of Marilyn Monroe in the 2001 CBS miniseries Blonde, based on a Joyce Carol Oates novel. The next role she was offered was a starring role as Samantha Spade on the CBS mystery drama Without a Trace. The series revolved around a missing-persons unit of the FBI in New York City. On being offered the part, she later said, "They (the producers) called me up and said, 'Will you do it?' I said, 'Um' and they said, 'Anthony LaPaglia is in it' and I said, 'sure'. It was that simple." Montgomery portrayed Samantha Spade for seven seasons, from when the show began on 26 September 2002 until it ended on 19 May 2009.

In April 2011, Montgomery completed filming a television biographical film Magic Beyond Words, appearing as Harry Potter author J. K. Rowling.

The same year, she began starring in the CBS police drama Unforgettable as Carrie Wells, a former homicide detective who is convinced to join the NYPD in Queens by her ex-boyfriend after she leaves Syracuse because the investigation into her sister's murder was shut down. The character has hyperthymesia, which allows her to have perfect recall, and she uses her memory to solve crimes. The first season, with 22 episodes, ran from September 2011 until May 2012, and CBS initially cancelled the show on 12 May 2012. Unforgettable was later renewed for a second season, with 13 episodes running from July 2013 to May 2014, and a third season, with 13 episodes running from June 2014 to September 2014. In October 2014, after the third season's conclusion, CBS cancelled the series again. In February 2015, A&E picked up the series for a fourth season of 13 episodes. The season ran on A&E from November 2015 to January 2016, and the series was cancelled in February 2016.

Montgomery posed in a series of provocative photographs on Maxim'''s website in their "Girls of Maxim" feature.

Personal life

Montgomery met actor Adam Kaufman in 2005 in Mexico while working on the independent film Between, and in 2010, they worked together again in the TV film Lying to be Perfect. In 2007, Kaufman began a recurring role on Without a Trace in the season-five episode "At Rest" as Brian Donovan, Samantha's love interest for the rest of the series. In June 2007, Montgomery announced her pregnancy with Kaufman, which was written into season six. On 23 December 2007, she gave birth to their son Jackson Phillip. Montgomery's Without a Trace co-star Anthony LaPaglia became Jackson's godfather. On 10 October 2011 in Life & Style, Montgomery and Kaufman were reported to have separated.

In late 2011, Montgomery began dating Shawn Sanford, director of lifestyle marketing for Microsoft, whom she met in Puerto Rico. In April 2013, she gave birth to their daughter, Violet Grace. In November 2014, she gave birth to their son Gus Monroe. On the 4 April 2014 episode of Live! with Kelly and Michael, Montgomery revealed that on Chinese New Year, she and Sanford were married at Disneyland in a ceremony with their children present.

Montgomery holds both Australian and American citizenship. She moved from Los Angeles to New York City in 2013 to continue filming Unforgettable''.

Filmography

Film

Television

References

External links

 

1972 births
20th-century American actresses
20th-century Australian actresses
21st-century American actresses
21st-century Australian actresses
Actresses from Sydney
American film actresses
American television actresses
Australian emigrants to the United States
Australian film actresses
Australian television actresses
Living people
People educated at Ascham School
People with acquired American citizenship